Orangeville/Castlewood Field Aerodrome  is located  northwest of Orangeville, Ontario Canada.

See also
Orangeville/Brundle Field Aerodrome

References

Registered aerodromes in Ontario
Transport in Orangeville, Ontario
Buildings and structures in Dufferin County